A cabrio coach or semi-convertible is a type of car that has a retractable textile roof, similar to a convertible/cabriolet. The difference is that where a convertible often has the B-pillar, C-pillar and other bodywork removed, the cabrio coach retains all bodywork to the top of the door frames and just replaces the roof skin and rear window with a retractable fabric panel.

An advantage of the cabrio coach, particularly for unibody designs is that retaining more of the car's original structure means that structural rigidity is higher (or the vehicle weight is lower) than traditional cabriolets.

If a vehicle's roof includes metal panels as well as the soft-top, it may be considered to be a canvas top design or a fixed-roof vehicle with a sunroof, instead of being a cabrio-coach. These have the advantage that they may be more easily retrofitted to an existing car; it was a factory option (although listed as a separate model) for the Volkswagen Beetle up to 1963.

History 
This type of roof was popular in Germany in the 1930s, and was found on cars such as the Citroën 2CV, Fiat 500, and others. The cabrio coach version of the Nash Rambler was marketed as a "convertible landau".

Some more modern cars have also featured this roof style, for instance Nissan Figaro, Citroën Visa Décapotable, Fiat 500 (2007), and the Citroën C3 Pluriel.

References 

Car body styles